Djedefre (also known as Djedefra and Radjedef) was an ancient Egyptian king (pharaoh) of the 4th Dynasty during the Old Kingdom. He is well known by the Hellenized form of his name Rhatoisēs (Ῥατοίσης) by Manetho. Djedefre was the son and immediate throne successor of Khufu, the builder of the Great Pyramid of Giza; his mother is not known for certain. He is the king who introduced the royal title Sa-Rê (meaning “Son of Ra”) and the first to connect his cartouche name with the sun god Ra.

Family 

Djedefre married his brother Kawab's widow, Hetepheres II, who was sister to both of them, and who perhaps married a third brother of theirs, Khafre, after Djedefre's death. Another queen, Khentetenka is known from statue fragments in the Abu Rowash mortuary temple. Known children of Djedefre are:
 Hornit (“Eldest King's Son of His Body”) known from a statue depicting him and his wife.
 Baka (“Eldest King's Son”) known from a statue base found in Djedefre's mortuary temple, depicting him with his wife Hetepheres.
 Setka (“Eldest King's Son of His Body; Unique Servant of the King”) known from a scribe statue found in his father's pyramid complex. It is possible that he ruled for a short while after his father's death; an unfinished pyramid at Zawiyet el-Arian was started for a ruler whose name ends in ka; this could have been Setka or Baka.
 Neferhetepes (“King's Daughter of His Body; God's Wife”) is known from a statue fragment from Abu Rowash. Until recently, she was believed to be the mother of a pharaoh of the next dynasty, either Userkaf or Sahure.

The French excavation team led by  found the names of two other possible children of Djedefre in the pyramid complex:
 Nikaudjedefre (“King's Son of His Body”) was buried in Tomb F15 in Abu Rowash; it is possible that he wasn't a son of Djedefre but lived later and his title was only honorary.
 Hetepheres (“King's Daughter of His Body”) was mentioned on a statue fragment.

Reign

The Turin King List credits him with a rule of eight years, but the highest known year referred to during this reign appears to be the year of his 11th cattle count. The anonymous year of the 11th count date presumably of Djedefre was found written on the underside of one of the massive roofing-block beams which covered Khufu's southern boat-pits by Egyptian work crews. Miroslav Verner notes that in the work crew's mason marks and inscriptions, "either Djedefra's throne name or his Golden Horus name occur exclusively." Verner writes that the current academic opinion regarding the attribution of this date to Djedefre is disputed among Egyptologists: Rainer Stadelmann,  favour dating it to Djedefre whereas Wolfgang Helck, Jean Vercoutter and W.S. Smith attribute this date to Khufu instead on the assumption "that the ceiling block with the date had been brought to the building site of the boat pit already in Khufu's time and placed in position [only] as late as during the burial of the funerary boat in Djedefre's time."

The German scholar Dieter Arnold, in a 1981 MDAIK paper noted that the marks and inscriptions of the blocks from Khufu's boat pit seem to form a coherent collection relating to the different stages of the same building project realised by Djedefre's crews.
Verner stresses that such marks and inscriptions usually pertained to the breaking of the blocks in the quarry, their transportation, their storage and manipulation in the building site itself: "In this context, the attribution of just a single inscription—and what is more, the only one with a date—on all the blocks from the boat pit to somebody other than Djedefra does not seem very plausible."

Verner also notes that the French-Swiss team excavating Djedefre's pyramid have discovered that this king's pyramid was really finished in his reign. According to Vallogia, Djedefre's pyramid largely made use of a natural rock promontory which represented circa 45% of its core; the side of the pyramid was 200 cubits long and its height was 125 cubits. The original volume of the monument of Djedefre, hence, approximately equalled that of Menkaura's own pyramid. Therefore, the argument that Djedefre enjoyed a short reign because his pyramid was unfinished is somewhat discredited. This means that Djedefre likely ruled Egypt for a minimum of 11 years if the cattle count was annual, or 22 years if it was biennial; Verner, himself, supports the shorter, 11-year figure and notes that "the relatively few monuments and records left by Djedefra do not seem to favour a very long reign" for this king.

Pyramid complex

It is the northernmost part of the Memphite necropolis.

While Egyptologists previously assumed that his pyramid at this heavily denuded site was unfinished upon his death, more recent excavations from 1995 to 2005 have established that it was indeed completed. The most recent evidence indicates that its current state is the result of extensive plundering in later periods while "the king's statues [were] smashed as late as the 2nd century AD." During the Roman period (ca. 2000 years ago), Djedefre's pyramid was quarried for its stone and, as such, there is little left standing today.  The 20th century has also not been kind to this monument – during the last century it was used as a military camp and its proximity to Cairo exposed it to modern development.

Some believe that the sphinx of his wife, Hetepheres II, which was part of Djedefre's pyramid complex, was the first sphinx created. In 2004, evidence that Djedefre was responsible for the building of the Sphinx at Giza in the image of his father was reported by the French Egyptologist Vassil Dobrev.

Due to the poor condition of Abu Rawash, only small traces of his mortuary complex have been found. Only the rough ground plan of his mud brick mortuary temple was able to be traced—with some difficulty—"in the usual place on the east face of the pyramid." His pyramid causeway proved to run from north to south rather than the more conventional east to west, while no valley temple has been found.

References

External links

Riddle of the Sphinx

 
26th-century BC Pharaohs
Pharaohs of the Fourth Dynasty of Egypt
Khufu
Year of birth unknown
Year of death unknown
Place of birth unknown